Thomas George Cross (2 September 1931 – 26 April 2020) was an Australian fencer. He competed in the team foil event at the 1956 Summer Olympics.

References

External links
 

1931 births
2020 deaths
Australian male fencers
Olympic fencers of Australia
Fencers at the 1956 Summer Olympics